Bushtown is an unincorporated community in Mercer County, Kentucky, United States.

References

Unincorporated communities in Mercer County, Kentucky
Unincorporated communities in Kentucky